Pentolite is a composite high explosive used for military and civilian purposes, e.g., warheads and booster charges. It is made of pentaerythritol tetranitrate (PETN) phlegmatized with trinitrotoluene (TNT) by melt casting.

The most common military variety of pentolite (designated "Pentolite 50/50") is a mixture of 50% PETN and 50% TNT. (Unlike other compound explosives, the number before the slash is the mass percentage of TNT and the second number is the mass percentage of PETN). This 50:50 mixture has a density of 1.65 g/cm3 and a detonation velocity of 7400 m/s.

Civilian pentolite sometimes contains a lower percentage of PETN, usually around 2% ("Pentolite 98/2"), 5% ("Pentolite 95/5") or 10% ("Pentolite 90/10"). Civilian pentolites have a detonation velocity of about 7,800 metres per second.

References

External links
 Additional information in re Pentolite boosters

Explosives